Lucas Lynggaard Tønnesen (born 13 July 2000) is a Danish actor. He is best known for his roles in the Netflix series The Rain and Borgen – Power & Glory. In 2022, Tønnesen starred in the Netflix multilingual mystery-science fiction series 1899.

Early life
Lucas Lynggaard Tønnesen was born in Copenhagen, Denmark. He has a younger sister, who is an acrobat. At the age of nine, he enrolled in a singing school in Copenhagen, joining a choir and travelling the world. In the summer of 2012, Tønnesen's father sent a recording of him singing to an audition, which landed the boy the leading role in a theatre play called Cirkus Summarum. Following this, Tønnesen expressed a deep interest in acting.

Career
Tønnesen began his career in film in the Danish comedy Player. He went on to appear in the film The Keeper of Lost Causes.

In 2014, he made his way into television by playing a regular role in the Danish series Tidsrejsen. In 2015, he starred as Oliver in the short film I Stykker. He resumed his foray into acting in 2018, taking on the role role of Rasmus Andersen in the first Netflix Danish series, The Rain at the age of sixteen. The series ran for three seasons, until 2020.

Tønnesen went on to star in multiple short films in subsequent years. In 2022, he took on a recurring role in a Netflix co-production series, Borgen – Power & Glory, as Magnus Nyborg Christensen. He later starred in the multilingual Netflix mystery-horror series 1899, created by Baran bo Odar and Jantje Friese.

Other ventures
In 2020, Tønnesen became an ambassador for Emporio Armani in the EA Building Dialogues Fashion Show in Milan. He personally met Giorgio Armani at that time.

Filmography

Film

Television

Theatre

References

External links
 
 
 Lucas Lynggaard Tønnesen at Lindberg Management

2000 births
Danish male actors
Male actors from Copenhagen
Living people